The Nanchang CJ-6 is a Chinese basic trainer aircraft designed and built by the Nanchang Aircraft Factory (now Hongdu Aviation) for use by the People's Liberation Army Air Force (PLAAF).

Development

The CJ-6 (Chu Jiao 初教 = Chuji Jiaolianji 初级教练机 = basic trainer aircraft) is an all-original Chinese design that is commonly mistaken for a Yak-18A. Its predecessor, the Nanchang CJ-5, was a licence-built version of the Yak-18. However, advancements in pilot training brought a need for a new aircraft with improved performance and a tricycle landing gear. When the Soviet Union developed the Yak-18A, PLAAF engineers decided that its performance and design would not suit China's needs.

The aircraft was designed in 1958 by the Nanchang Aircraft Factory (now Hongdu Aviation). As the Shenyang Aircraft Factory already had experience building the Shenyang JJ-1 begun technical research for the CJ-6, more than 20 Shenyang designers were transferred to Nanchang, including chief designers Tu Jida and Lin Jiahua. Xu Shunshou and Huang Zhiqian, then China's top aircraft designers, were also involved.

During late 1957 Aeronautical Engineers Cheng Bushi and Lin Jiahua began work in Shenyang on a trainer design that addressed the shortcomings of the Yak-18A. The design they delivered featured an aluminum semi-monocoque fuselage, flush-riveted throughout, and introduced a modified Clark airfoil wing design with pronounced dihedral in the outer sections. The dihedral and an angular vertical tail distinguish it externally from the otherwise vaguely similar Yak-18A.  Wind tunnel testing validated the design, and in May 1958 the program was transferred to the Nanchang Aircraft Manufacturing factory where Chief Engineer Gao Zhenning initiated production of the CJ-6. The first flight of the CJ-6 was completed on August 27, 1958, by Lu Maofan and He Yinxi.

Power for the prototype was provided by a Czech-built horizontally-opposed piston engine, but flight testing revealed the need for more power, so a locally manufactured version of the Soviet AI-14P 260 hp radial, the Housai HS-6, was substituted along with a matching propeller, and with that change the CJ-6 was approved for mass production. In 1965 the HS-6 engine was upgraded to 285 hp and redesignated the HS-6A, and the aircraft equipped with the new power plant were designated the CJ-6A.

A total production run estimated at more than 3,000 aircraft supplied CJ-6 aircraft for PLAAF training, as well as for export (as the PT-6) to countries including Albania, Bangladesh, Cambodia, North Korea, Tanzania, and Sri Lanka.

It is expected Hongdu/Yakovlev joint developed CJ-7 Trainer (L-7) primary trainer will replace CJ-6s in PLAAF.

CJ-6 attained its civil aviation type certificate on February 28, 2019, more than 60 years after it entered military service in China.

General information
One thing to note is that the Nanchang CJ-6 makes extensive use of pneumatics to control the gear and flap extension/retraction, operate the brakes and start the engine. An engine-driven air pump recharges the system; however if air pressure is too low to start the engine then the onboard air tank can be recharged by an external source. If an external source is not available then the engine can be started by hand swinging the propeller.

Variants

Hongzhuan-502 (Hongzhuan - Red Craftsman)
Initial designation of production CJ-6 aircraft.
CJ-6
Two-seat primary trainer aircraft, powered by a 260-hp Zhuzhou Huosai HS-6 radial piston engine.
CJ-6A
Improved version, powered by a 285-hp Zhuzhou Huosai HS-6A radial piston engine. 
CJ-6B
Two-seat armed border patrol aircraft, powered by a 300-hp Zhuzhou Huosai HS-6D radial piston engine. Small number built.
BT-6
Export designation of the CJ-6 and CJ-6A.
PT-6A
Export version of the CJ-6A
Haiyan A (Haiyan - Petrel)
Haiyan Prototype. First flew on August 17, 1985.
Haiyan B
Single-seat agricultural topdressing, aerial spraying, fire-fighting aircraft, fitted with an upgraded 345-hp Huosai HS-6 radial piston engine.
Haiyan C
General aviation variant for agriculture and leisure flight.

Operators

Albanian Air Force

Bangladesh Air Force: ≤ 24 PT-6 in service.

Khmer Air Force

Ecuadorian Army Aviation 

People's Liberation Army Air Force
People's Liberation Army Navy Air Force

Korean People's Army Air Force

Lao People's Liberation Army Air Force

Sri Lanka Air Force

Tanzania Air Force Command

Zambian Air Force

Civilian use 
Due to its low price and sturdy construction, the CJ-6A is a popular hobby plane. A used CJ-6 in the United States can cost as little as $75,000. The aircraft appears on the civil register of the US, Australia, New Zealand, UK, South Africa and other countries.

In Australia, CJ-6 aircraft are generally operated in the Limited Category. This is administered by the Australian Warbirds Association Limited (AWAL). The AWAL operates under an approval from the Australian government's Civil Aviation Safety Authority (CASA) to manage the operation of ex-military aircraft.

Accidents and incidents

 A Sri Lanka Air Force PT-6 aircraft which took off from China Bay, Trincomalee crashed near Kantale, Sri Lanka on 15 December 2020 killing trainee pilot on board.

A privately owned CJ6A was involved in a July 5, 2021 collision with a lawn maintenance machine while attempting a landing ( https://halifax.citynews.ca/national-news/tsb-says-quebec-pilot-in-fatal-collision-with-lawn-tractor-didnt-get-ok-for-landing-5148003) killing the operator of the lawn machine and damaging the aircraft.  The pilot was uninjured.

Specifications (CJ-6A)

References

External links

Warbird Alley: CJ-6 page
CJ-6 photos and development review, Chinese language
Warbird Registry: Nanchang CJ-5/CJ-6 Registry

1950s Chinese military trainer aircraft
Nanchang aircraft
Low-wing aircraft
Single-engined tractor aircraft
Aircraft first flown in 1958